Robert Lynch Halliday (born 14 January 1986), is a Scottish football defender currently playing for Neilston in the Scottish Junior Football Association, West Region.

Career

Halliday started his career with Clyde. He never made a senior appearance for the club, though he did appear as an unused substitute. He was released by Clyde in January 2004. 

He went on to join Hamilton Academical for a season, where he made one appearance, before leaving them in 2005. In July 2009, he re-signed for Clyde, after being successful in the club's open trials. He was released from his contract in December 2009, after making 13 appearances.

After a spell in amateur football, Halliday signed for Junior side Ashfield in 2011 and joined Irvine Meadow in June 2012.

Halliday was called up to the Scotland Junior international squad in October 2012 for their fixture against the Republic of Ireland.

References

External links

Living people
1986 births
Scottish footballers
Clyde F.C. players
Hamilton Academical F.C. players
Ashfield F.C. players
Irvine Meadow XI F.C. players
Scottish Football League players
Scottish Junior Football Association players
Footballers from Glasgow
Association football defenders
Scotland junior international footballers